Funsho Ibrahim Bamgboye (born 9 January 1999) is a Nigerian professional footballer who plays as a forward for Romanian club Rapid București.

Playing career

Early years
Born in Lagos, Bamgboye joined the Aspire Academy Senegal youth team in 2012, when he was discovered by the Aspire Football Dreams talent search program and given a scholarship. He qualified by being named one of the top three players in his age group amongst those selected from Nigeria. He led his team to a victory at the 2014 Al Kass International Cup in Qatar, where they defeated Real Madrid in the final in a penalty shootout.

He first attracted attention in April 2015, when he helped his club win that year's U16 Mediterranean International Cup in Spain, which included teams such as Villarreal and Sevilla. He supplied the game-winning assist in the final.

Club career
In late 2016, it was reported that Bamgboye had undergone trials in Hungary with top flight club Szombathelyi Haladás.
In January 2017, on his eighteenth birthday, Bamgboye officially signed a two and a half year contract with Haladás. Although there was initially an issue to get him his work permit, he finally made his debut on 25 February, during a 2–0 loss to Újpest. He came on as a 70' substitute for Márk Jagodics.

International career
In October 2015, Bamgboye was named in Nigeria's squad to represent the national under-17 team at the 2015 FIFA U-17 World Cup in Chile. He made five appearances in the tournament, recording three assists. In the final against Mali, he scored the second goal in the 2–0 victory to help the Golden Eaglets secure the world title.

He also represented the national under-20 team at the 2017 Africa U-20 Cup of Nations qualification tournament. Although one of the team's key members, he was left off the squad by head coach Emmanuel Amunike for the first leg of their third round match-up against Sudan. He made his return to the team in the second leg as a part of the starting lineup. He scored a 26th-minute header off a cross from teammate Samuel Chukwueze; however, Nigeria lost 4–3 and were eliminated on away goals.

Career statistics

Club

Honours
Fehérvár
 Magyar Kupa runner-up: 2020–21

Nigeria U17
 FIFA U-17 World Cup: 2015

References

External links

 
 
 

Living people
1999 births
Nigerian footballers
Nigerian expatriate footballers
Nigeria youth international footballers
Nigeria under-20 international footballers
Association football forwards
Szombathelyi Haladás footballers
Fehérvár FC players
Nemzeti Bajnokság I players
FC Rapid București players
Liga I players
Expatriate footballers in Senegal
Expatriate footballers in Hungary
Expatriate footballers in Romania
Nigerian expatriate sportspeople in Senegal
Nigerian expatriate sportspeople in Hungary
Nigerian expatriate sportspeople in Romania
Sportspeople from Ibadan
Naturalized citizens of Hungary
Aspire Academy (Senegal) players